The National Rugby League (NRL) is the top league of professional rugby league clubs in Australasia. Run by the Australian Rugby League Commission, however, there has not been a league-wide Reserve Grade competition since 1988, when the former New South Wales Rugby League expanded interstate to make the first attempt at a national competition, with the NRL Reserve Grade competition being shut down at the end of the 2002 season.

As a result, NRL-listed players who are not selected in their senior teams are made eligible to play in one of the second-tier state leagues: the New South Wales Cup or the Queensland Cup. The system used to accommodate NRL-listed players within these leagues varies considerably from state to state.

Current affiliations 
In the 2022 season, the seventeen National Rugby League clubs will have the following reserves arrangements.

 Currently the only NSW Cup & QLD Cup teams not affiliated with an NRL club is Queensland Cup team  PNG Hunters, based in Port Moresby, Papua New Guinea and most recently the North Sydney Bears.

Participating clubs by season

Bold=NSW Cup

Underline=Qld Cup

See also
 NSWRL Reserve Grade (1908 - 2002)

Notes

References

External links

National Rugby League
New South Wales Cup
Queensland Cup
Rugby league in Australia